Golestan Rural District may refer to:
 Golestan Rural District (Golestan Province)
 Golestan Rural District (Isfahan Province)
 Golestan Rural District (Kerman Province)
 Golestan Rural District (North Khorasan Province)